This is a list of Chinese dishes in Chinese cuisine.

Dishes by ingredient

Grain-based dishes

Noodles

Rice

Pork-based dishes

Poultry-based dishes

Vegetable-based dishes

Dishes by cooking method

Dumplings

Pastry

Soups, stews and porridge

Dishes by region

Anhui

Beijing

Cantonese

Chaozhou

Fujian

Guangxi

Southern Guangxi cuisine is very similar to Guangdong cuisine. Northern Guangxi cuisine, such as the dishes below, is quite different.

Hainan

Hakka

Hunan

Hubei

Jiangsu

Northeast

Shaanxi

Shanxi

Shandong

Sichuan

Yunnan

Zhejiang

Unsorted
 Guokui

See also 

 List of Chinese desserts
 List of Chinese restaurants
 List of Chinese sauces
 List of Chinese soups
 List of restaurants in China

References 

Dishes
Chinese Dishes